"Gray Matter" is the fifth episode of the first season of the American television crime drama series Breaking Bad. Written by Patty Lin and directed by Tricia Brock, it aired on AMC in the United States and Canada on February 24, 2008.

Plot 
Walter and Skyler White attend a birthday party for their wealthy acquaintance, Elliott Schwartz. Years earlier, Walt and his then-girlfriend Gretchen had formed a company called Gray Matter Technologies with Elliott—the company name derived from mixing the colors in their last names, "White" and "Schwartz" (German for "black")—but Walt opted to sell his share for USD 5,000 after breaking up with Gretchen. Subsequently, the company had become extremely successful, making billions, and Elliott married Gretchen. Walt is tense at the birthday party due to this troubled past. When Elliott offers him a job and tells him Gray Matter has excellent health insurance, Walt realizes that Skyler told Elliott about his cancer and gets upset with her.

After a failed job interview, Jesse Pinkman shows his friend Badger the RV Walt and Jesse use as a meth lab. In the desert, Jesse is frustrated that the quality of his meth is inferior to that of Walt's and throws his own product away, much to Badger's dismay. Jesse cooks a couple more batches, which he also discards. Badger and Jesse brawl over the wasted meth, and Jesse pushes him out of the RV and drives away.

Over the weekend, Walt Jr. and two friends are waiting outside a convenience store, waiting for somebody to buy them beer. The friends run away when Walt Jr. approaches a policeman. The policeman tells him he got his "first and last warning." Skyler holds an intervention for Walt, where she says she does not understand why Walt is refusing treatment. Hank Schrader, Walt Jr., and Marie Schrader argue over what to do: while Skyler and Walt Jr. want him to take the treatment, Marie, and later Hank, feel Walt should be given the choice to decline the treatment if he wants. Walt ends the intervention by saying he will not do the treatment.

The next morning, Walt has a change of heart and tells Skyler he will do the treatment, and he will take care of Elliott's check. Later, Gretchen calls, telling him that he has to accept the money. Walt says he appreciates the offer, but lies and says his insurance will now cover it. Walt then goes to Jesse's house and asks him if he wants to cook.

Production 
The episode was written by Patty Lin and directed by Tricia Brock; it aired on AMC in the United States and Canada on February 24, 2008. Actress Ali MacGraw filmed a cameo scene for the episode but it was cut.

Critical reception 
The episode was well received. Seth Amitin of IGN gave the episode a rating of 8.9 out of 10. Donna Bowman of The A.V. Club gave the episode an "A−".

In 2019 The Ringer ranked "Gray Matter" as the 34th best out of the 62 total Breaking Bad episodes.

References

External links 
 "Gray Matter"  at the official Breaking Bad site
 

2008 American television episodes
Breaking Bad (season 1) episodes